The South African Railways Class  of 1973 was a narrow-gauge diesel–electric locomotive.

Between September and December 1973, the South African Railways placed twenty Class  General Electric type UM6B diesel–electric locomotives in service on its narrow-gauge Avontuur Railway between Port Elizabeth in the Eastern Cape and Avontuur in the Western Cape. Some of them later also worked on the Alfred County Railway out of Port Shepstone in KwaZulu-Natal.

Manufacturer

The Class  GE type UM6B diesel–electric locomotive was designed and built for the South African Railways (SAR) by General Electric (GE) in Erie, Pennsylvania. Twenty were delivered between September and December 1973, numbered 91-001 to 91-020.

GE's usual practice was to attach locomotive builder's works plates to the unit's frame below the cab. The Class  units were delivered with their works plates mounted below their number plates on the cabsides. When they were repainted in the Spoornet orange livery in the 1990s, the SAR number plates were removed and these works plates were relocated to each side of the long hood. It is very likely that the out-of-sequence works plates were the result of body panels being swapped between locomotives during overhauls.

Characteristics
As a result of the severe clearance problems presented by the two-foot gauge, it was not possible to follow the usual practice of axle-hung traction motors. Special bogies had to be designed with both traction motors mounted between the axles and with one traction motor on each side of each bogie.

The locomotives are air as well as dynamically braked. A lag control was incorporated into the train's brake pipes to prevent bunching of the wagons upon braking and snatching upon restarting. This, combined with the cabling required for multi-unit control, resulted in altogether seven cable connections between consisted units.

The Class  also introduced the new Willison or SA3 coupler which replaced the old Bell-and-hook type coupler on new Avontuur Railway rolling stock acquired for limestone traffic in the 1970s.

Service

South African Railways
The Class  replaced the Class NG G13 and NG G16 Garratts which had been working the Langkloof narrow gauge line until then, but for a number of years it worked alongside the Class NG15 Kalahari steam locomotives. It is the only diesel–electric locomotive type to have operated on South Africa's narrow-gauge lines.

These locomotives served nearly exclusively on the Langkloof line, but between 1992 and December 2003 a few of them also worked on the Alfred County Railway (ACR) narrow-gauge line out of Port Shepstone. Units which were transferred to and from Natal usually travelled all the way from Port Elizabeth under their own power on what became known as Bigfoot bogies, which were actually  Class 36-000 GE type SG10B bogies. These Bigfoot bogies were also used under the Class  locomotives whenever they had to be exchanged for maintenance purposes, sometimes running under their own power, sometimes hauled dead.

Over the years since the Class  was commissioned, the demand for rail services declined steadily on both the ACR and the Langkloof lines. Still, even though road transport had triumphed over rail transport in respect of fruit traffic in the Langkloof by the 1980s, the eastern part of the line remained busy for some years hauling limestone from Loerie. When the quarry that fed Loerie station by cableway was closed, however, the fate of the narrow-gauge line was virtually sealed.

Despite this, in the Avontuur Railway's centenary year in 2003 Spoornet still stated its commitment to keep the line in service by undertaking to invest in infrastructure and technology. As late as September 2005 there was even talk of extending the  branch line from Loerie further into the Gamtoos valley to assist farmers who had difficulty moving their produce.

Of the 20 built, 18 were still operational in 2009, two having been withdrawn after accident damage. However, Transnet Freight Rail (TFR) had decided that narrow-gauge railway operations were no longer in its "core line of business" and began putting some of the locomotives up for auction.

It was mounted on Bigfoot bogies of which only one was equipped with traction motors, and equipped with AAR knuckle couplers for use as a shunting engine at the Swartkops electric locomotive depot in Port Elizabeth. This is the locomotive that was purchased by the Sandstone Estate less the bogies. The rest of the fleet which were still on the TFR roster were standing idle, staged at the narrow-gauge depot at Humewood Road in Port Elizabeth. Mass scrapping of these locomotives is expected to take place in January 2019.

Industrial service
Five locomotives were sold to RRL Grindrod, a joint venture between Solethu Investments, a South African Black Economic Empowerment (BEE) rail logistics company, and Grindrod Limited, a shipping and logistics group, for use at Welkom in the Free State to haul mine hoppers. The fifth was the accident-damaged no. 91-009 which was completely rebuilt with a 700 hp Caterpillar main engine. It is today (December 2018) the Capitol Park Shunter for Rovos Rail and has been re-numbered 91-011
engine-generator.

Three more units were sold at auction on 11 July 2013. These were purchased by a Port Elizabeth scrap merchant for rebuilding and resale. One (91-011) was sold to Argentina. By April 2017, both those remaining 13/18 are in storage in restored condition inside the Humewood Road diesel depot and are for sale (December 2018). One was used locally in December 2017 as a replacement for a failed NG15 on tourist train duty.

Preservation
No. 91-001 is preserved at the Outeniqua Transport Museum in George.

They are in use on the narrow-gauge tourist trains running from Allwoodburn Siding at Ixopo in KwaZulu-Natal.

No. 91-010 was sold to Sandstone Estates in basic operating condition and arrived at their facility by road on 31 October 2016. After some maintenance and correction of faults, it performed route-proving runs during the first week of April 2017. It then entered regular service on the Sandstone Railroad during the Sandstone Stars of 2017 event. Its first duty was the recovery of NG/G16 88 which had failed at Vilima. 91-016 and 91-019 were also purchased by the Sandstone Estates in September 2017 and February 2019 respectively.

In December 2018, it was confirmed that the Apple Express organization based at Humewood Road have purchased 91-005 and leased 91-020 from the THF. 91-005 was started up for the first time in over twelve years in December 2018.

In February 2023, it was reported that 91-016 had been purchased by Mr. Matt Dolby, and was in transit to the UK. It is fitted with 2 ft gauge bogies.

Fleet numbers

The Class 91-000 builder's works numbers and their known disposal are listed in the table.

Liveries
The Class  were all delivered in the SAR Gulf Red livery with signal red buffer beams, yellow side stripes on the long hood sides and a yellow V on each end. In the 1990s they began to be repainted in the Spoornet orange livery with a yellow and blue chevron pattern on the buffer beams. Only one, 91-001, was repainted in the Spoornet blue livery with outline numbers on the long hood sides in about 2006.

References

External links

Bo-Bo locomotives
Diesel-electric locomotives of South Africa
General Electric locomotives
Railway locomotives introduced in 1973
2 ft gauge locomotives